The Sever Zotta Romanian Institute of Genealogy and Heraldry is a research institute located in Iași. The institute was established in 1999, being registered as a non-profit organization on January 14, 1999.

The founding members of the institute are:

 Gabriel Bădărău
 Constantin Bălăceanu-Stolnici
 Radu Beldiman
 Ioan Căprosu
 Dan Cernovodeanu
 Paul Cernovodeanu
 Daniel Ciobanu
 Mircea Ciubotaru
 Costin Clit
 Mihai Cojocaru
 Andi-Marius Daschevici
 Zoe Diaconescu
 Vasile Docea
 Maria Dogaru
 Ioan Drăgan
 Gheorghe I. Florescu
 Grigore Ghika
 Ștefan S. Gorovei
 Radu Sc. Greceanu
 Sergiu Groholschi-Miclescu
 Cătălin Hriban
 Sorin Gh. Iftimi
 Constantin Ittu
 Niculae Koslinski
 Marcel Lutic
 Jean Nicolas Mănescu
 Costin Merișca
 Zamfira Mihail
 Gheorghe Musat
 Petre S. Năsturel
 Ioan Niculita
 Catalina Opaschi
 Liviu Papuc
 Paul Paltanea
 Katiuşa Pârvan
 Gheorghe Platon
 Stefan Pleșia
 Ioan-Aurel Pop
 Rodica Popovici
 Flavius Solomon
 Maria Magdalena Székely
 George Felix Taşcă
 Răzvan Theodorescu
 Andrei Tukacs
 Mihai Răzvan Ungureanu
 Silviu Văcaru
 Petronel Zahariuc

References

Genealogical societies
History organizations based in Romania
Research institutes in Romania